Beth Shalom Congregation is a Conservative synagogue in Columbia, Maryland. It is the only Conservative congregation in Howard County, Maryland.

History
When the town of Columbia, Maryland, was formed in the 1960s, in accordance with an idea of James Rouse, an Interfaith Center was created where all places of worship in the town would initially share a hall.

The attempt to first organize a Jewish community in the Columbia area began in 1967. Temple Solel (now known as Temple Isaiah) became the area's Reform temple, and Beth Shalom became the area's Conservative congregation. Both have since obtained their own buildings. 

Beth Shalom was founded in 1969. It has since grown to approximately 250 families.

Spiritual leaders
The original spiritual leader was the late Rabbi Noah Golinkin, who was hired in 1978. Rabbi Kenneth Cohen was the second spiritual leader, who assumed the position in 1986.

The third spiritual leader of Beth Shalom was Rabbi Susan Grossman, who has held the position from 1997 to 2022. Grossman was ordained in 1985 and is considered unusual for being a female rabbi in the Conservative movement from that generation. Grossman is known for authoring works on the Conservative view of ritual purity.

References

External links

Columbia, Maryland
Conservative synagogues in Maryland
Howard County, Maryland landmarks
Religious buildings and structures in Howard County, Maryland
Jewish organizations established in 1969